Sofia Andreyevna Rudieva (born  15 November 1990) is a Russian actress, model and beauty pageant titleholder who was crowned Miss Russia 2009 and then represented Russia at Miss Universe 2009.

Biography 
Sofia Rudieva was born in 1990 in Leningrad, now Saint Petersburg.

In March, 2009, she won the Miss Russia 2009 pageant, and was awarded with a $100,000 prize.

After her victory, she was named Russia's representative in the Miss Universe 2009 contest, which was to be held in the Bahamas in August, 2009.

Miss Universe 2009 crown was won by Venezuela's Stefanía Fernández but Sofia did not place.

See also 
 Ksenia Sukhinova
 Svetlana Stepankovskaya

References

Living people
1990 births
Russian female models
Miss Universe 2009 contestants
Miss Russia winners
Female models from Saint Petersburg